Chanajon P.K. Saenchai Muaythai Gym (born July 9, 1988) is a Thai Muay Thai fighter from the Buriram province of Thailand. He is a former Rajadamnern Stadium Light Middleweight Champion.

Personal life
Chanajon appeared in the 2017 film A Prayer Before Dawn as a Muay Thai fighter named Chanachol who faces the lead character at the end of the film.

Muay Thai career 
Chanajon currently competes for the THAI FIGHT promotion, where he has won the 2017 THAI FIGHT Tournament at 72.5 kg. As of February 2020, Chanajon is ranked the No. 9 middleweight by WBC Muaythai. As of October 2020, he is ranked the No.6 middleweight by the WMO World Muay Thai Organization.

On March 15, 2014, Chanajon defeated Eakchanachai at Omnoi Stadium to win the 24th Isuzu Cup Tournament.

THAI FIGHT 
By winning the Isuzu Cup, he was able to appear on Thailand's major Muay Thai event: THAI FIGHT. Chanajon would make his THAI FIGHT debut at THAI FIGHT World Battle 2014: Chakrinaruebet on April 6, 2014. Facing Saiyok Pumpanmuang in the 2014 Isuzu Cup Superfight, he went on to lose by second-round knockout via elbow.

Chanajon would win his next THAI FIGHT bout, defeating Anes Lakhmari by first-round KO on August 16, 2014 at THAI FIGHT World Battle 2014: Nakhon Sawan.

On September 20, 2014, Chanajon lost by first-round KO to Naimjon Tuhtaboyev via spinning back elbow at THAI FIGHT World Battle 2014: Vietnam.

He closed out 2014 with wins over Nabil Lettat and Gaëtan Dambo on November 22 and December 21 respectively, both of which were at THAI FIGHT.

Chanajon returned to THAI FIGHT on April 30, 2016, facing Nicholas Carter at THAI FIGHT Samui 2016. He wound up winning the three-round decision.

He would return to compete for THAI FIGHT on a long-term basis beginning 2017, when he appeared at THAI FIGHT Barcelona on September 30, 2017. There, he lost to Edye Ruiz by three-round decision.

He would bounce back with a three-round decision win over Islam Murtazaev in the 2017 THAI FIGHT 72.5 kg Semi-Finals at THAI FIGHT Chiang Mai on December 23, 2017.

On January 27, 2018, he rematched with Saiyok Pumpanmuang, whom he faced in his THAI FIGHT debut, this time with the 2017 THAI FIGHT 72.5 kg Championship on the line. In their rematch, Chanajon ended up winning by second-round knockout after landing a high kick, claiming the 2017 THAI FIGHT 72.5 kg title.

On February 9, 2020 Chanajon challenged Jimmy Vienot for his WMC World -160 lbs title at the Empire Fight event in France. He lost by the fight by decision.

Titles and accomplishments 
 THAI FIGHT 
 2017 Thai Fight King's Cup Tournament Champion (72.5 kg / 160 lb) 
 20–3 record
 IMTU
 2015 IMTU Muay Thai World Champion (72.5 kg / 160 lb)
 Omnoi Stadium
 2014 Isuzu Cup Tournament Winner
 Rajadamnern Stadium 
 2010 Rajadamnern Stadium Light Middleweight Champion (70 kg / 154 lb)

Muay Thai record

|- style="background:#fbb;"
| 2020-02-08|| Loss ||align=left| Jimmy Vienot || Empire Fight || Doubs, France || Decision || 5 || 3:00
|-
! style=background:white colspan=9 |
|- style="background:#cfc;"
| 2019-12-21|| Win ||align=left| Nayanesh Ayman ||  THAI FIGHT Thai Fest in Patong || Phuket, Thailand || Decision || 3 || 3:00
|- style="background:#cfc;"
| 2019-10-26|| Win ||align=left| Charlie Guest || THAI FIGHT Bangsaen || Chonburi, Thailand || Decision || 3 || 3:00
|-  style="background:#cfc;"
| 2019-08-24|| Win ||align=left| Thiago Texeira || THAI FIGHT Kham Chanod || Udon Thani, Thailand || Ext.R. Decision || 4 || 3:00
|-  style="background:#cfc;"
| 2019-06-29|| Win ||align=left| Jean Carlos Pereira || THAI FIGHT Betong || Betong, Thailand || TKO (Injury) || 1 || 3:00
|- style="background:#cfc;"
| 2019-04-27 || Win ||align=left| Patryk Borowski Beszta || THAI FIGHT Samui 2019 || Ko Samui, Thailand || Decision || 3 || 3:00
|- style="background:#cfc;"
| 2019-03-30 || Win ||align=left| Naimjon Tuhtaboev || THAI FIGHT Mueang Khon 2019 || Nakhon Si Thammarat, Thailand || Decision || 3 || 3:00
|-  style="background:#cfc;"
| 2019-02-23 || Win || align="left" | Philipp Engeroff || THAI FIGHT Phuket 2019 || Phuket, Thailand || KO (Punch) || 2 ||
|-  style="background:#cfc;"
| 2018-12-23 || Win ||align=left| Philipp Engeroff || THAI FIGHT Chiang Mai || Chiang Mai, Thailand || Decision || 3 || 3:00
|- style="background:#cfc;"
| 2018-11-24 || Win ||align=left| Reza Ahmadnezhad || THAI FIGHT Saraburi || Saraburi, Thailand || TKO || 1 ||
|- style="background:#cfc;"
| 2018-10-27|| Win ||align=left| Erhan Gungor  || THAI FIGHT Chiangrai 2018 || Chiang Rai, Thailand || KO (Punch) || 1 ||
|-  style="background:#cfc;"
| 2018-08-25|| Win ||align=left| Timur Djabbarov  || THAI FIGHT Rayong || Rayong, Thailand || KO (Punches) || 2 ||
|-  style="background:#cfc;"
| 2018-07-07|| Win ||align=left| Pite Htwe || THAI FIGHT Hat Yai || Hat Yai, Thailand || KO (Knees and elbows) || 2 ||
|-  style="background:#cfc;"
| 2018-05-12|| Win ||align=left| Keivan Solemani  || THAI FIGHT Samui 2018 || Ko Samui, Thailand || Decision || 3 || 3:00
|- style="background:#cfc;"
| 2018-03-24|| Win ||align=left| Gligor Stojanov || THAI FIGHT Mueang Khon 2018 || Nakhon Si Thammarat, Thailand || Decision || 3 || 3:00
|-  style="background:#cfc;"
| 2018-01-27 || Win ||align=left| Saiyok Pumpanmuang || THAI FIGHT 2017 Bangkok || Bangkok, Thailand || KO (High kick) || 2 || 
|-
! style=background:white colspan=9 |
|-  style="background:#cfc;"
| 2017-12-23 || Win ||align=left| Islam Murtazaev || THAI FIGHT Chiang Mai || Chiang Mai, Thailand || Decision || 3 || 3:00
|-  style="background:#fbb;"
| 2017-09-30 || Loss ||align=left| Edye Ruiz || THAI FIGHT Barcelona || Barcelona, Spain || Decision || 3 || 3:00
|-  style="background:#cfc;"
| 2017-05-27 || Win ||align=left| Jimmy Vienot || Warriors Night || Paris, France || Decision || 5 || 3:00
|-  style="background:#cfc;"
| 2016-11-27 || Win ||align=left| Johane Beausejour || Warriors Night || Paris, France || Decision || 5 || 3:00
|-  style="background:#cfc;"
| 2016-04-30 || Win ||align=left| Nicholas Carter || THAI FIGHT Samui 2016 || Ko Samui, Thailand || Decision || 3 || 3:00
|-  style="background:#cfc;"
| 2016-03-12 || Win ||align=left| Gaëtan Dambo || Emperor Chok Dee || Meurthe-et-Moselle, France || KO || 2 ||
|-  style="background:#cfc;"
| 2015-12-11 || Win ||align=left| Jimmy Vienot || Best of Siam 7 || Paris, France || Decision || 5 || 3:00
|-  style="background:#cfc;"
| 2015-10-10 || Win ||align=left| Mickael Francoise || Battle 974 || Réunion, France || TKO || 2 ||
|-
! style=background:white colspan=9 |
|-  style="background:#fbb;"
| 2015-09-26 || Loss ||align=left| Youssef Boughanem || Omnoi Stadium || Bangkok, Thailand || Decision || 5 || 3:00
|-
! style=background:white colspan=9 |
|-  style="background:#cfc;"
| 2015-08-08 || Win||align=left| Sirimongkol Sitanupap || Omnoi Stadium || Bangkok, Thailand || Decision || 5 || 3:00
|-  style="background:#cfc;"
| 2014-12-21 || Win||align=left| Gaëtan Dambo || THAI FIGHT 2014 || Bangkok, Thailand || Decision || 3 || 3:00
|-  style="background:#cfc;"
| 2014-11-22 || Win||align=left| Nabil Lettat || THAI FIGHT 2014 || Khon Kaen, Thailand || TKO (Referee stoppage) || 3 ||
|-  style="background:#fbb;"
| 2014-09-20 || Loss ||align=left| Naimjon Tuhtaboev || THAI FIGHT WORLD BATTLE 2014: Vietnam || Ho Chi Minh City, Vietnam || KO (Spinning back elbow) || 1 ||
|- style="background:#cfc;"
| 2014-08-16 || Win ||align=left| Anes Lakhmari || THAI FIGHT WORLD BATTLE 2014: Nakhon Sawan || Nakhon Sawan, Thailand || KO || 1 ||
|- style="background:#fbb;"
| 2014-04-06 || Loss ||align=left| Saiyok Pumpanmuang || THAI FIGHT WORLD BATTLE 2014: Chakrinaruebet || Sattahip, Thailand || KO (Left elbow) || 2 ||
|- style="background:#cfc;"
| 2014-03-15 || Win ||align=left| Eakhanachai Kaewsamrit || Omnoi Stadium || Bangkok, Thailand || Decision || 5 || 3:00 
|-
! style=background:white colspan=9 |
|- style="background:#cfc;"
| 2014-02-15 || Win ||align=left| Peemai Jitmuangnon || Omnoi Stadium || Bangkok, Thailand || TKO || 5 ||
|-  style="background:#cfc;"
| 2013-11-23 || Win ||align=left| Anantadet Petchsupapan || Omnoi Stadium || Bangkok, Thailand || KO || 3 ||
|-  style="background:#fbb;"
| 2013-10-12 || Loss ||align=left| Yodpayak Sitsongpeenong || Omnoi Stadium || Bangkok, Thailand || Decision || 5 || 3:00
|-  style="background:#cfc;"
| 2010-00-00 || Win ||align=left| Jaochalarm Sor. Pinyo || Rajadamnern Stadium ||  Bangkok, Thailand || Decision || 5 || 3:00
|-
! style=background:white colspan=9| 
|-
| colspan=9 | Legend:

Lethwei record

|- style="background:#c5d2ea;"
| 2016-10-09 || Draw || align="left" | Too Too|| GTG International Challenge Fights 2016 || Yangon, Myanmar || Draw || 3 || 
|-
| colspan=9 | Legend:

References

External links
 Chanajon P.K. Saenchai Muaythai Gym at THAI FIGHT

1988 births
Living people
Middleweight kickboxers
Chanajon P.K. Saenchai Muaythaigym
Chanajon P.K. Saenchai Muaythaigym
Chanajon P.K. Saenchai Muaythaigym